KKBB (99.3 FM, "Groove 99.3") is a commercial radio station located in Bakersfield, California.  The station is owned by Alpha Media, LLC, through licensee Alpha Media Licensee LLC. KKBB airs a rhythmic oldies music format. The station was assigned the KKBB call letters by the Federal Communications Commission on December 9, 1994.  KKBB's studios and transmitter are separately located in Oildale.

History
KKBB was originally known by the call letters of KCHT airing a Top 40 music format branded as "The Heat".  The radio station was built and owned by Elgee Broadcasting Corporation. It signed on the air for the first time at 6 p.m. on November 3, 1990. The music programming was syndicated by ABC Radio Networks.

In 1994, ABC Radio Networks ceased syndication of their Top 40 "Heat" format.  KCHT changed their call letters to KOQQ, and then KKBB, and adopted a classic rock music format branded as "B Rock 99." The format lasted until 2003, when it flipped to rhythmic oldies and rebranded as Groove 99.3.

Airstaff
The current weekday line-up on this station includes local hosts Danny P on mornings, Erik Fox on mid-days, Emilio on afternoons, and Lisa St. Regis on nights.

References

External links
Groove 99.3 KKBB official website

Rhythmic oldies radio stations in the United States
KBB
Radio stations established in 1990
1990 establishments in California
Alpha Media radio stations